Prospect may refer to:

General 
 Prospect (marketing), a marketing term describing a potential customer
 Prospect (sports), any player whose rights are owned by a professional team, but who has yet to play a game for the team
 Prospect (mining), a particular geological area on which searching for minerals or fossils is commonly carried out

Arts, entertainment, and media

Periodicals
 Prospect (architecture magazine), a Scottish architecture magazine
 Prospect (magazine), a monthly British essay and comment magazine
 The American Prospect, an American quarterly policy magazine

Other uses in arts, entertainment, and media
 Prospect (film), 2018 American science fiction film starring Sophie Thatcher, Jay Duplass, and Pedro Pascal
  Prospect (rapper), a New York City rapper who collaborates with Full a Clips Crew and former member of Terror Squad
 Prospect (Slovenian band), a progressive metal band from Ljubljana, Slovenia
 Prospects (TV series), British series
"Prospects", a song by Madness from the 1984 album Keep Moving

Organizations and enterprises
 Prospect (trade union), a United Kingdom trade union of professionals
 Prospect Pictures, a television production company in London, England
 The Prospect Studios, a television studio in Los Angeles, United States
 Prospects (charity), a UK Christian charity
 King's Academy Prospect, a secondary school in West Reading, Berkshire, England

Sports
 Edmonton Prospects, baseball team in the Western Canadian Baseball League

Places

Australia
 Prospect, New South Wales, suburb of the City of Blacktown, near Sydney
 Division of Prospect, an electoral district in the Australian House of Representatives, in New South Wales, surrounding the suburb
 Prospect, Queensland, Queensland
 Prospect, Tasmania, suburb of Launceston, Tasmania
 City of Prospect, a local government area in South Australia
 Prospect, South Australia, seat of City of Prospect council, Adelaide

Canada
 Prospect, Nova Scotia
 Lower Prospect, Nova Scotia
 Prospect Bay, Nova Scotia

United Kingdom
 Prospect, Cumbria, a settlement in Oughterside and Allerby
 Prospect, a townland in County Antrim, Northern Ireland
 Prospect, a townland in County Tyrone, Northern Ireland

United States
 Prospect (Topping, Virginia), listed on the NRHP in Virginia
 Prospect, Connecticut
 Prospect, Georgia
 Prospect, Indiana
 Prospect, Kentucky
 Prospect, Maine
 Prospect, New York
 Prospect, North Carolina
 Prospect, Ohio
 Prospect, Oregon
 Prospect, Pennsylvania
 Prospect, Bradley County, Tennessee
 Prospect, Giles County, Tennessee
 Prospect, Virginia
Prospect House (Princeton, New Jersey), the former president's house and current faculty house, known also as Prospect (and listed as that on U.S. National Register) 
 Mount Prospect, Illinois

Elsewhere
 Prospect, Corlough, a townland in County Cavan, Republic of Ireland
 Prospect, a  place in Saint Vincent and the Grenadines

See also 
 Prospect Avenue (disambiguation)
 Prospect High School (disambiguation), various high schools
 Prospect Hill (disambiguation)
 Prospect Park (disambiguation)
 Prospector (disambiguation)
 Prospekt (disambiguation)